Municipal elections were held in Toronto, Ontario, Canada, on January 1, 1948. Robert Hood Saunders was re-elected as mayor in an election that also saw no changes on the Board of Control or City Council.

Toronto mayor
Mayor Robert Hood Saunders faced only Trotskyist Ross Dowson and was easily reelected.

Results
Robert Hood Saunders - 118,097
Ross Dowson - 15,008

Board of Control
All four members of the Toronto Board of Control were re-elected.
Results
Hiram E. McCallum (incumbent) - 83,812
John Innes (incumbent) - 80,834
David Balfour (incumbent) - 77,087
Kenneth Bert McKellar (incumbent) - 75,356
Stewart Smith - 47,791
Harry Bradley - 15,711
Harry Clairmont - 4,858

City council

Ward 1 (Riverdale)
Leslie Saunders (incumbent) - 7,970
Charles Walton (incumbent)  - 7,059
Eugene Murdoch - 4,730
Harry Marley - 2,501
Arnold Lorenz - 1,967

Ward 2 (Cabbagetown and Rosedale)
Louis Shannon (incumbent) - 6,628
Everett Weaver (incumbent) - 5,288
May Birchard - 4,048
William Dennison - 2,892
Roy Boskett - 356

Ward 3 (West Downtown and Summerhill)
Harold Fishleigh (incumbent) - 4,712
Allan Lamport  (incumbent) - 3,848
Frank Nasso - 943
Will Smith - 514

Ward 4 (The Annex, Kensington Market and Garment District)
Nathan Phillips (incumbent) - 7,346
Norman Freed (incumbent) - 6,304
Francis Chambers - 6,243
William Gallaher - 588

Ward 5 (Trinity-Bellwoods
Arthur Frost (incumbent) - 9,525
Charles Sims (incumbent) - 8,030
Joseph Gould - 7,333
Margaret Luckock - 3,192
Patrick McKeown - 796

Ward 6 (Davenport and Parkdale)
Frank Clifton (incumbent) - 13,924
George Granell (incumbent) - 15,589
Dewar Ferguson - 7,830
Samuel Thomas - 2,331

Ward 7 (West Toronto Junction)
William Butt (incumbent) - 7,629
E.C. Roelofson (incumbent) - 7,115
John Lenglet - 3,259

Ward 8 (The Beaches)
W.H. Collings (incumbent) - acclaimed
Roy Mealing (incumbent)  - acclaimed

Ward 9 (North Toronto)
Leonard Reilly (incumbent) - 12,643
Melville Wilson (incumbent) - 11,458
Frank Nash - 9,366

Results taken from the January 2, 1949 Globe and Mail and might not exactly match final tallies. Ward 4 results from January 5, 1948 issue.

Changes
Ward 7 Alderman William Butt died January 10, 1948; Charles Rowntree was appointed replacement January 19.

Mayor Robert Hood Saunders resigned February 23, 1948 when he was appointed Chairman of Ontario Hydro; Controller Hiram E. McCallum was unanimously appointed Mayor; Ward 7 Alderman E.C. Roelfson was appointed Controller February 24; William Davidson appointed Alderman March 1, 1948.

References
Election Coverage. Toronto Star. January 2, 1949
Election Coverage. Globe and Mail. January 2, 1949

Toronto municipal election
1948
Toronto municipal election
Municipal election, 1948
Toronto municipal election